Presbyterian Rest for Convalescents, also known as the Y.W.C.A. of White Plains and Central Westchester, is a historic convalescent home located at White Plains, Westchester County, New York. It was built in 1913, and is a -story, "H"-shaped building in the Tudor Revival style.  The two lower stories are in brick and the upper stories in half-timbering and stucco.  It has a tiled gable roof with dormer windows.  The section connecting the two wings includes the main entrance, which features stone facing and Tudor arches.  The connected Acheson Wallace Hall was built in 1972. The building housed a convalescent home until 1967, after which it was acquired by the Y.W.C.A. and operated as a residence for women.

It was added to the National Register of Historic Places in 2011.

See also
National Register of Historic Places listings in southern Westchester County, New York

References

External links
Y.W.C.A. of White Plains website
Opening of the Presbyterian Rest on the site of the former military school - NYTimes, June 4, 1893

Residential buildings on the National Register of Historic Places in New York (state)
Buildings and structures completed in 1913
Tudor Revival architecture in New York (state)
Buildings and structures in White Plains, New York
1913 establishments in New York (state)
National Register of Historic Places in Westchester County, New York